Hostovice may refer to several places in Czech Republic and Slovakia.

Hostovice, part of city Pardubice, Czech Republic
Hostovice, Snina District, Slovakia